Helter Shelter  may refer to:

 Helter Shelter (cartoon), a 1955 Woody Woodpecker cartoon
 "Helter Shelter" (The Simpsons), a 2002 episode of the animated television series The Simpsons
 "Helter Shelter" (The Powerpuff Girls) a 2001 episode of the animated television series The Powerpuff Girls